Bžany (until 1921 Vebžany) is a municipality and village in Teplice District in the Ústí nad Labem Region of the Czech Republic. It has about 900 inhabitants.

Administrative parts
Villages of Bukovice, Hradiště, Lbín, Lhenice, Lysec, Mošnov and Pytlíkov are administrative parts of Bžany.

References

Villages in Teplice District